Grant Street Station, also known as the B&O Pittsburgh Terminal, was a passenger rail station on Grant Street downtown Pittsburgh, Pennsylvania. The Baltimore and Ohio Railroad (B&O) announced plans for it on May 3, 1955, after selling the original B&O Station bordering the Monongahela River to the state for construction of Interstate 376.  It opened in 1957 to serve commuter rail traffic; all intercity traffic continued to use the Pittsburgh and Lake Erie Railroad's (P&LE) station (now called Station Square). Grant Street was the last such privately owned train station built in Pennsylvania.

After the Port Authority of Allegheny County (PAT) assumed control of the B&O's Pittsburgh—McKeesport—Versailles commuter route in 1975 (which it re-branded PATrain), Grant Street continued to serve as the Pittsburgh depot for this service. PAT discontinued the service in 1989; Grant Street itself was demolished in 1998. The site is now home to PNC Firstside Complex and the First Avenue light rail station.

See also
Eliza Furnace Trail
Union Station (Pittsburgh)
Wabash Pittsburgh Terminal

References 

Railway stations in Pittsburgh
Demolished railway stations in the United States
Railway stations in the United States opened in 1957
Railway stations closed in 1989
Former Baltimore and Ohio Railroad stations
Former railway stations in Allegheny County, Pennsylvania